The 1999 FIA GT Hockenheim 500 km was the third round the 1999 FIA GT Championship season. It took place at the Hockenheimring Short Circuit, Germany, on June 27, 1999.

Official results
Cars failing to complete 70% of winner's distance are marked as Not Classified (NC).

Statistics
 Pole position – #2 Chrysler Viper Team Oreca – 1:01.532
 Fastest lap – #2 Chrysler Viper Team Oreca – 1:03.505
 Average speed – 141.169 km/h

References

 
 

H
FIA GT Hockenheim